This is a list of Turkish Navy major surface ships that have served past and present, from 10 July 1920 to present.

Battleship

Brandenburg class

Battlecruiser



Protected cruisers

Mecidiye

Hamidiye

Torpedo cruisers



Destroyers

(Version of  French Navy ):

(Ex- Kaiserliche Marine S-165 class):

(Version of  Regia Marina ):

(Version of  Regia Marina ):

Gayret 

(Ex- Royal Navy ):

(Modified  Royal Navy ):

Ex- (US Navy)

Ex-M-class (Royal Navy) 

(Ex- Royal Navy M-class destroyer):

Ex- (US Navy) 

(Ex- US Navy :)

Ex- (US Navy) 

Ex- US Navy :

Ex- (US Navy) 

(Ex- US Navy :)

Ex-Carpenter class (US Navy)

Ex- US Navy Carpenter-class anti submarine destroyer:

Frigates

(Modified  US Navy ):

(Ex- Bundesmarine : F120)

(Ex-  US Navy ):

Gabya class 

(Ex-  US Navy):

( Blohm + Voss MEKO 200 TN):

( Blohm + Voss MEKO 200 TN II-A):

Salihreis class  

( Blohm + Voss MEKO 200 TN II-B):

Corvettes

Burak class 

(Ex-  French Navy):

Ada class 

( - MILGEM):

Sources

External links 
 Serhat Guvenc, "Building a Republican Navy in Turkey: 1924-1939", International Journal of Naval History
 Unofficial Homepage of Turkish Navy

Surface ships
Lists of ships of Turkey
Ships of the Turkish Navy